Mor language may refer to:

Mor language (Papuan)
Mor language (Austronesian)